Rifat Gabdulkhakovich Shaykhutdinov (born December 23, 1963) is a Russian politician. He currently serves as a member of the State Duma and the Chairman of the State Duma's Committee on Relations with CIS States and Compatriots, and Deputy Chairman of the State Duma's Committee on Power, Transport and Telecommunications. From 1992 to 1997 he was director of the Center for Experts in the Ministry of State Property in the Northwest Region.

An ethnic Tatar, Shaykhutdinov is a deputy for the Urals Federal District. He is also an author of a novel  Political hunting  that contains his works in relation to the political analysis of the social and political situation in Russia as well as worldwide. Shaykhutdinov is a father of two children, Anna (born in 1989) and Rod (born in 1992).

References

1963 births
Living people
Liberal Democratic Party of Russia politicians
Tatar people of Russia
21st-century Russian politicians
Fourth convocation members of the State Duma (Russian Federation)
Fifth convocation members of the State Duma (Russian Federation)
Seventh convocation members of the State Duma (Russian Federation)
Eighth convocation members of the State Duma (Russian Federation)
Civic Platform (Russia) politicians